Hismaic is a variety of the Ancient North Arabian script and the language most commonly expressed in it. The Hismaic script may have been used to write Safaitic dialects of Old Arabic, but the language of most inscriptions differs from Safaitic in a few important respects, meriting its classification as a separate dialect or language. Hismaic inscriptions are attested in the Ḥismā region of Northwest Arabia, dating to the centuries around and immediately following the start of the Common Era.

Characteristics

Phonology 
There are clear instances of d being used for /ḏ/ in the variant spellings of the divine name Ḏū l-S2arā as ds2r or ds2ry – as against classical ḏs2r or ḏs2ry.

The spelling ʿbdmk for ʿbdmlk suggests an interchange of n for l (with unvocalised n assimilated to the following k), similar to that found in Nabataean where the name of the kings named Malichos occurs as both mlkw and mnkw and the compound as both ʿbdmlkw and ʿbdmnkw.

Grammar 
Perhaps the most salient distinction between Safaitic and Hismaic is the attestation of the definite articles h-, hn-, ʾ-, and ʾl- in the former. A prefixed definite article is not attested in Hismaic. Nevertheless, Hismaic seems to attest a suffixed -ʾ on nouns and hn in personal names. The use of the morpheme h- as a demonstrative is attested.

References

Arabic languages
History of Saudi Arabia
Ancient North Arabian